Batang Bibbo! is a Philippine television informative children show broadcast by GMA Network. Hosted by Roxanne Barcelo, it premiered on November 8, 2008. The show concluded on November 21, 2009 with a total of 55 episodes.

The show was awarded by Anak TV Seal.

Overview
A weekly 30-minute educational show geared for Filipino preschool children ages three to six years old. It aims to develop the social skills and language development of children through entertaining and enriching methods that are curriculum-based, age appropriate and culturally enriching.

The show featured puppets, Bi and Bo, Tsing and Gong in a magical learning place called Bibbolandia where they will meet new friends, learn new things and develop new skills. They are joined by the friendly Ate Anne (Roxanne Barcelo) who will help them solve simple problems and take them to new worlds of learning and discovery through her fascinating songs and stories.

Combining puppetry, songs, animation, storytelling and live action, the show promotes the proper use of Filipino language. It will also highlight constructive interpersonal skills like sharing, helping, taking turns, making friends, confidence, honesty, respect for diversity, sportsmanship and other social skills.

Hosts
 Roxanne Barcelo as Ate Anne
 Renz Valerio
 Franchesca Salcedo
 Angeli Nicole Sanoy

Puppets
 Bi
 Bo
 Tsing
 Gong

Ratings
According to AGB Nielsen Philippines' Mega Manila household television ratings, the final episode of Batang Bibbo! scored a 10% rating.

Accolades

References

External links
 

2008 Philippine television series debuts
2009 Philippine television series endings
Filipino-language television shows
GMA Network original programming
GMA Integrated News and Public Affairs shows
Philippine children's television series